Hibbertia prostrata, commonly known as bundled Guinea-flower, is a small shrub that  is endemic to south-eastern Australia. 
It grows to 50 cm tall and has narrow leaves that are about 20 mm long and about 1 mm wide. Yellow flowers appear from September to December in the species native range. The species occurs in heath  in South Australia, Victoria and Tasmania.

Hibbertia prostrata is listed as a synonym of Hibbertia fasciculata by the Australian Plant Census.

References

prostrata
Flora of South Australia
Flora of Tasmania
Flora of Victoria (Australia)